Bonifacio Zarcal (13 January 1920 – 3 April 1993) was a Filipino boxer. He competed in the men's bantamweight event at the 1948 Summer Olympics.

References

External links
 

1920 births
1993 deaths
Filipino male boxers
Olympic boxers of the Philippines
Boxers at the 1948 Summer Olympics
Place of birth missing
Bantamweight boxers